Bobby Andonov (born 28 August 1994), known by his stage name BOBI, is an Australian singer, songwriter and producer.

Early life
Bobby Andonov was born on 28 August 1994 in Melbourne, Australia to Macedonian parents originating from Strumica, North Macedonia. He has performed since the age of six, when he started dancing and singing in his hometown of Melbourne. At the age of nine, he starred as Danny Zuko in a junior production of Grease the musical. He lived in North Macedonia from the age of 13 to 15. He was then selected to be one of four young Simbas in the Broadway production of The Lion King in Melbourne and Shanghai, China.

Music career

At the age of 14, Andonov represented North Macedonia at the Junior Eurovision Song Contest 2008 in Cyprus. Out of 15 countries, he came in fifth with his song "Prati Mi SMS", which led to a European tour around the Balkans. In 2010 Andonov entered for Australia's Got Talent. His audition reached over 15 million views. He was a grand finalist on the show, performing covers of songs including Leonard Cohen's "Hallelujah" and Kanye West's "Heartless". In 2010, record producer and music critic Molly Meldrum flew Andonov to Sydney to meet R&B singer Usher.

In early 2014, Andonov wrote two songs for the Australian feature film The Dream Children, directed by Robert Chuter. He also worked on Afrojack’s 2014 debut album Forget the World, co-writing the track "Born to Run", which features Tyler Glenn of Neon Trees on vocals. Andonov co-wrote and co-produced the 2015 single "Stone", recorded by The X Factor Australia winner Cyrus Villanueva.

In November 2015, Andonov was signed to a deal with Hollywood Records and moved to Los Angeles, where he currently resides. On 20 October 2017, he released his debut single "Apartment", along with a music video for the song which reached number 9 in the Top 50 global playlist on spotify.

Influences
Andonov has cited Terence Trent D'Arby, Prince and George Michael as music influences.

Discography

Singles
 "Apartment" (2017)
 "Faithful" (2018)
 "Smoke" ft Son Lux (2018)

Production and writing credits

See also
Music of Australia

References

External links

 Official website

1994 births
Living people
Australian people of Macedonian descent
Australian pop singers
Australian soul singers
Australian child singers
Australian singer-songwriters
Junior Eurovision Song Contest entrants
Australia's Got Talent contestants
Hollywood Records artists
Australian male singer-songwriters